Michael Kopf (born 20 December 1948)  in Götzis) is a former Austrian racing driver. Michael Kopf began his career in 1967 in a Steyr-Puch 650 TR. He participated in various national and international championships. From 1984 to 1987, Michael Kopf drove his Alfa GTV 6 and Alfa 75 Turbo 7 DTM races.

References 

1948 births
Living people
Austrian racing drivers
Deutsche Tourenwagen Masters drivers